The Steiger Award or Der Steiger is an international award established in 2005 and presented annually by the award organization based in Bochum, Germany. The title refers to steiger (mining foreman), reflecting the qualities of responsibility, honesty, openness and hard work valued in the Ruhr region where the award is presented.

The award was created by private initiative and is presented annually to individuals who are notable for accomplishments in charity, music, film, media, sports, the environment and building of the European community.

Past winners include Nena, Egon Bahr, Udo Jürgens, Jean-Claude Juncker, Boris Becker, David Frost, Bob Geldof, Maximilian Schell, Richard Chamberlain, Stefanie Powers, Robin Gibb, Christopher Lee, Mark Knopfler, Klaus Meine, Roger Daltrey, Jean-Michel Jarre, Bonnie Tyler and Peter Lindbergh.

Laureates

2000s 

 2005
 Charity: Farah Pahlavi
 Tolerance: Shimon Peres
 Music: Robin Gibb
 Media: Friedrich Nowottny
 Environment: 
 Film: Pierre Brice
 Art: 
 Young: Liel Kolet
 Lifetime Achievement: Bonnie Tyler

2006
 Charity: José Carreras
 Music: Peter Maffay
 Media: Sabine Christiansen
 Environment: Mohamed ElBaradei
 Film: Friedrich von Thun
 Art: James Rizzi
 Sport: Boris Becker
 Europe: Jean-Claude Juncker
 Young: Tokio Hotel
 Lifetime Achievement: Heinz Sielmann
 
 2007
 Charity: Rupert Neudeck
 Tolerance: Hamid Karzai
 Music: Wolfgang Niedecken
 Media: Peter Scholl-Latour
 Environment: Achim Steiner
 Film: Manfred Krug & Iris Berben
 Art: Franz Beckenbauer
 Sport: Hans-Dietrich Genscher
 Europe: US5
 Young: Joachim Fuchsberger
 Political courage: Gabriele Pauli

 2008
 Charity: Claudia Cardinale
 Tolerance: Hans Küng
 Music: Udo Jürgens
 Media: Maybrit Illner
 Environment: Erivan Haub
 Film: Dieter Pfaff
 Art: Aliza Olmert
 Sport: Jens Lehmann & Egidius Braun
 Europe: Edmund Stoiber
 Young: Jimi Blue & Wilson Gonzalez Ochsenknecht
 Entertainment: Hape Kerkeling
 Special prize: Hélène Grimaud
 
 2009
 Charity: Maria Teresa, Grand Duchess of Luxembourg
 Tolerance: Roman Herzog
 Music: Bob Geldof
 Media: David Frost
 Film: Veronica Ferres
 Art: Gottfried Helnwein
 Sport: 
 Europe: Romano Prodi & Aleksander Kwaśniewski
 Lifetime Achievement: Maximilian Schell
 Entertainment: Dieter Hallervorden

2010s 
2010

 Charity: Eva Köhler
 Music: Marius Müller-Westernhagen
 Media: Alfred Biolek
 Environment: 
 Film: Armin Mueller-Stahl
 Art: Robert Wilson
 Sport: Haya bint Hussein
 Europe: Boris Tadić
 Young: Christopher Lee

 2011
 Charity: Cherie Blair
 Tolerance: Egon Bahr
 Music: Mark Knopfler & Roger Daltrey
 Media: Reinhold Beckmann
 Environment: Stefanie Powers
 Film: Klaus Maria Brandauer
 Art: Frank Gehry
 Sport: Vitali & Wladimir Klitschko
 Europe: José Manuel Barroso
 Lifetime Achievement: Richard Chamberlain
 
 2012
 Charity: Queen Silvia of Sweden
 Tolerance: Horst Köhler
 Music: Lou Reed
 Media: Peter Kloeppel
 Environment: Hannes Jaenicke
 Film: Christine Neubauer
 Art: Wolfgang Joop
 Europe: Recep Tayyip Erdoğan
 Young: Tim Bendzko
 Lifetime Achievement: Christiane Hörbiger
 Ruhr Prize: Steven Sloane
 
 2013
 Tolerance: Kurt Masur
 Music: Scorpions
 Environment: Michael Otto
 Film: Jürgen Prochnow
 Art: Albert Watson
 Sport: Rudi Völler
 Europe: Kurt Biedenkopf & Alfred Grosser
 Young: Liselotte Pulver
 International Music: Jean-Michel Jarre
 
 2014
 Charity: Queen Sofía of Spain
 Tolerance: Karl Lehmann
 Music: Ute Lemper
 Media: Johannes B. Kerner
 Film: Hannelore Hoger
 Sport: German Olympic Sports Confederation
 Lifetime Achievement: Buzz Aldrin
 Ruhr Prize: Hans-Joachim Watzke
 Special prize: Quincy Jones

 2019
 Charity: Uschi Glas
 Music:  & Santiano
 Media: Anne Will
 Film: Senta Berger & Michael Mendl
 Sport: Andrej Plenković
 Europe: Lukas Rieger
 Young: Heino
 Ruhr Prize:

References

External links 
 

Awards established in 2005
Humanitarian and service awards
International awards
German awards